Anastasia Marie "Ana" Horne is a former American actress and singer who has appeared on television and in theater.  Her last television role was in 2000  as "Lori" on the MTV series Undressed. From 1997 to 1999 she starred as "Lark Madison-Scanlon" on the daytime soap opera Port Charles.  She was cast as "Ana" on the NBC/The Disney Channel series Kids Incorporated from 1984 to 1985, and 1991 to 1994.

Career
As a stage actress, Horne appeared in the theater productions Joseph and the Amazing Technicolor Dreamcoat and West Side Story.

Personal life
Anastasia attended Claremont High School in Claremont, California.  She is also a graduate of California State Polytechnic University - Pomona, and a 1997 initiate of the Chi Omega sorority.

She studied masonry at Bath Spa University.

Filmography

References

American child actresses
American soap opera actresses
Living people
Actresses from California
21st-century American singers
21st-century American women singers
Year of birth missing (living people)